Forgiven, Not Forgotten is the debut studio album by Irish pop rock group the Corrs. It was released by Atlantic Records on 26 September 1995 across the world. The album was primarily produced by David Foster, with additional production by Jim Corr. In January 1997, a special tour edition of the album was released in Australia and New Zealand and featured a bonus disc containing live and rare tracks which were recorded from their Forgiven, Not Forgotten World Tour.

The title track and the band were featured in an episode of Beverly Hills, 90210 called "Turn Back the Clock". The band performed the song at a New Year's Eve party at the Peach Pit After Dark. The album spawned five official single releases.

Background
Before signing to Atlantic Records the band began recording in a makeshift-home-studio Jim rented out in their hometown of Dundalk. The band recorded on an eight-track and began making demo tapes, "I remember it being very cold... We had fruit boxes on the wall for soundproofing" Caroline remembered. After performing in Whelan's bar in Dublin, the band caught the eye of Jean Kennedy Smith who invited the band to perform at the 1994 FIFA World Cup in Boston.

Once in America they met Jason Flom, Atlantic Records's head of A&R: "When they walked into my New York office, I was immediately taken by their beauty, their obvious grace and style. They played me a cassette with "Love to Love You" and "Closer" on it, then they told me they played all the instruments themselves and wrote the songs. Man, I thought I'd died and gone to heaven." However Flom knew the band needed someone to produce their album so suggested they meet David Foster, a Canadian musician, producer, composer and arranger. While in New York, two days before the band were scheduled to head home, they crashed a recording session at The Hit Factory, a recording studio in New York City. Foster invited the band upstairs to perform around a piano, where they sang "Forgiven, Not Forgotten" live. Sharon would go on to say "I think he was taken back  by how polished we sounded even then".

Tour
On 26 April 1996, the Corrs embarked on their Forgiven, Not Forgotten World Tour that started in Ennis, Ireland, before then travelling to Europe, Australia, Asia, America and Canada, ultimately lasting the better part of two years.

Track listing

Personnel

The Band
 Andrea Corr – lead vocals, tin whistle
 Caroline Corr – drums, bodhrán, acoustic piano, vocals
 Jim Corr – guitar, keyboards, acoustic piano, keyboard programming, vocals 
 Sharon Corr – violin, vocals

Featuring
 David Foster – additional keyboards, string arrangements
 Simon Franglen – Synclavier programming
 Michael Thompson – guitar
 Tal Herzberg – bass guitar on "Secret Life"
 Neil Stubenhaus – bass guitar on "Toss the Feathers"
 Simon Phillips – drums on "Toss the Feathers"

Production
 Producers and Arrangements – Jim Corr and David Foster
 Engineers – Andrew Boland, Felipe Elgueta and Dave Reitzas.
 Mixing – Dave Reitzas and Bob Clearmountain
 Mix Assistant – Ryan Freeland
 Mastered by Bob Ludwig at Gateway Mastering (Portland, ME).
 Assistant Mastering Engineer – Brian K. Lee
 Art Direction – Richard Bates and Sung Lee-Crawforth
 Photography – Guzman (Constance Hansen and Russell Peacock).

Charts and certifications

Weekly charts

Year-end charts

Certifications

Release details
1995, UK, Atlantic 7567-92612-2, release date: 22 September 1995, CD
1995, Mexico, Atlantic 7826-94675-2, release date: 22 September 1995, CD
1995, UK, Atlantic 7567-92612-4, release date: 26 September 1995, Cassette
1995, Japan, Warner AMCY-913, release date; 21 December 1995, CD (with bonus track)
1996, UK (reissue), release date: 19 February 1996, CD    
1997, Japan, Warner AMCY-2427, release date: 25 October 1997, CD (with bonus track)
1997, Australia, New Zealand, Atlantic 7567-92754-2, release date: January 1997, CD (limited tour edition)
1999, UK, Atlantic 7567926128, release date: 29 November 1999, MiniDisc
2001, Australia, Atlantic 7567-80963-2, release date: 2001, CD (double release with Talk on Corners special edition)
2001, France, Atlantic 7567-93072-2, release date: 2001, CD (as gold disc limited collector's edition)
2017, The Netherlands, Music On Vinyl Atlantic MOVLP1768 8719262002456, release date: 2017-05-26, 1 LP, 180 gram audiophile vinyl

Notes

References

1995 debut albums
The Corrs albums
Albums produced by David Foster
143 Records albums